is a Japanese futuristic motorsports anime television series produced by Asatsu-DK, VAP and Sunrise. The series originally aired between March 15 and December 20, 1991 on Nippon TV and was later followed by four OVA series respectively titled: Double One, Zero, Saga, and Sin. It has also been adapted into multiple games, artbooks, toys, audio dramas, and novels.

Outside of Japan, the series has aired in the Philippines by ABS-CBN for Hero TV, and in Italy on Italia 1. An English-subtitled DVD boxset of the TV series has also been released by Bandai in 2003. Medialink licensed the full series across Asia-Pacific in 2021.

Summary

In the near future, Cyber Formula, an automobile race in a different category from Formula One, with cars equipped with pollution-free engines such as hydrogen engines and room-temperature superconducting motors, and artificial intelligence for navigation, is gaining popularity. The series and first three OVAs are mainly set around Hayato Kazami, who was accidentally registered as a driver of Asurada, a Cyber Formula machine developed by his father. He enters the Cyber Formula Grand Prix and grows up through a cycle of setbacks and triumphs.

The TV series, which aired in 1991, is set in 2015, and the sequel OVAs 11 (Double One) through SAGA are set in the years 2016–2020, mainly from the perspective of Sugo Asurada (later Sugo Grand Prix and Sugo Winners), one of the teams competing in the 10th-15th Cyber Formula World Grand Prix, with Hayato as the main character.

The OVA SIN is set in the 16th–17th Cyber Formula World Grand Prix in 2021–2022, and features Bleed Kaga (Jōtarō Kaga) as the main character in a fierce life-or-death struggle with Hayato, who has come to be known as the young emperor of the circuit.

Although non-canon, the 18th (2023) Cyber Formula tournament can be played in the game Future GPX Cyber Formula: Road to the Infinity 2 for PlayStation 2, and in Future GPX Cyber Formula: Road to the Infinity 3, in addition to the 18th tournament, the 19th (2024) tournament can be played in the Scenario Mode. Although the production staff of the original anime cooperated in the creation of these games, the publisher, Sunrise Interactive, has adopted the stance that these games are "non-canon sequels."

Production
Future GPX Cyber Formula was animated by Sunrise and produced by entertainment company VAP and advertising agency Asatsu-DK, and was aired on early Friday mornings from March 15 to December 20, 1991 on Nippon TV. The series was Mitsuo Fukuda's directorial debut. When the project was first planned, it was largely intended for children, and the style was that cars with artificial intelligence would run through strange places in an obstacle race-like manner, clashing with each other along the way. It was planned to be like Speed Racer, and the races in the TV series were described as a triathlon of motor sports, as they were not only on circuits and city courses, but also on gravel surfaces and ice. However, the F1 boom led to a change to a full-fledged racing series. The futuristic car designs were done by Shōji Kawamori, known for his Valkyrie designs in the Macross series.

Red Company was involved in the production of the TV series, as it was with Mashin Hero Wataru, and the company's Chōji Yoshikawa was in charge of directing the series structure handled by Hiroyuki Hoshiyama. According to Yoshikawa, the sponsor, Takara, wanted to show races on Friday's broadcast and release the winning car as a toy on Saturday. However, Yoshikawa decided to limit the number of races to one per month, as car racing required more artistic ability than an average robot anime, and thus the number of races was limited to 10 per year. Who would win where, and the final standings were created first.

Jun'ichi Kanemaru was chosen to play the role of Hayato, the main character of the TV series, in his first starring role, but at the time of the audition, few animes had male voice actors playing 14-year-old boys, and since Mayumi Tanaka had played the role of Wataru, the main character in the previous show, Mashin Hero Wataru, it was assumed that Shinobu Adachi, another female voice actor, would also play the role of Hayato. However, there was a suggestion from within Sunrise to have Kanemaru, a male voice actor, participate in the tape audition, and although there were initial objections within the company, Kanemaru was ultimately selected through the audition.

Related media

OVA
Four sequel OVAs based on the TV series were produced. The first OVA, Future GPX Cyber Formula 11 (Double One), was released in 6-episode volumes between November 1, 1992 and June 1, 1993. The second, Future GPX Cyber Formula ZERO, was released in 8 volumes between April 1, 1994 and February 1, 1995. The third, Future GPX Cyber Formula SAGA, was released in 8 volumes between August 1, 1996 and July 2, 1997. The fourth and final OVA, Future GPX Cyber Formula SIN, was released in 5 volumes between December 21, 1998 and March 17, 2000.

An additional two-episode OVA, Future GPX Cyber Formula EARLYDAYS RENEWAL, was released between April and June 1996. The OVA recaps the events of the TV series with new scenes and voice acting, as well as some story changes.

Novels
A spinoff novel titled  was published by Tairiku Shobo on August 21, 1992, written by the screenwriter of the TV series Toshirō Ōyama and illustrated by series character designer Takahiro Yoshimatsu. The novel depicts what happened after the first half of the TV series regarding Smith's plot against Asurada. A novel depicting Bleed Kaga's past, including the reason for the scar on his forehead, titled  and written by series director Mitsuo Fukuda, was announced to be released by the same publisher on November 1992, but was cancelled due to Tairiku Shobo going bankrupt.

A novelization of the Saga arc of the OVA sequel series, written by Fukuda and illustrated by series original character designer Mutsumi Inomata, was published by Shogakukan on April 1, 1998. The novelization covers the first half of the story up to episode 4 of the 8-episode OVA, although there are differences in the depiction of some details. A sequel covering the second half of the OVA was supposed to be written, but it was never completed.

Video games
The series has been adapted into several video games, including an eponymous sugoroku game for the Game Boy (Barrier, February 28, 1992), an eponymous top-down racing game for the Super Famicom (Takara, March 19, 1992, released in North America as Cyber Spin), and a choice-based adventure game for the PlayStation titled  (VAP, March 18, 1999) where players take on the role of an original character, Seiichirō Shiba, a rookie driver, and enter a special race across the American continent called "Extreme Speed." The series has also been adapted into the Road to the Infinity series of real-time racing games published by Sunrise Interactive for the PlayStation 2, GameCube and PlayStation Portable between 2003-2008, and the Sin Cyber Grand Prix series of Sunrise-approved doujin PC games published by PROJECT YNP between 2003-2018.

Reception
The TV series won the Animage Anime Grand Prix in 1991.

References

External links
 
 
 
Studio Live page
Cyber Formula Database 

 
1991 anime television series debuts
1996 anime OVAs
Anime with original screenplays
Bandai Entertainment anime titles
Bandai Namco franchises
Fictional motorsports in anime and manga
Medialink
Nippon TV original programming
Sunrise (company)
Animated television series about auto racing
English-language television shows
Winner of Kodansha Manga Award (Shōnen)
Video games set in Hong Kong
Fiction set in 2015
1994 anime OVAs